Takashi "Tak" Fujimoto, ASC (born July 12, 1939) is an American cinematographer.

Fujimoto was born in San Diego, California. He is of Japanese descent. During World War II, he was interned at the Poston War Relocation Center due to Executive Order 9066.  A graduate of the London Film School, he has worked with filmmakers Jonathan Demme, M. Night Shyamalan, John Hughes, Howard Deutch and Terrence Malick. Early in his career, he worked on the second unit of the first Star Wars film, as well as the exploitation film Switchblade Sisters.

In 2011 he worked on the pilot for the television drama A Gifted Man.

Filmography

Film

Television

References

External links
 

1939 births
American cinematographers
American people of Japanese descent
People from San Diego
Living people
Japanese-American internees
Alumni of the London Film School